The 2019–20 UCF Knights men's basketball team represents the University of Central Florida during the 2019–20 NCAA Division I men's basketball season. The Knights are members of the American Athletic Conference. The Knights, in the program's 51st season of basketball, are led by fourth-year head coach Johnny Dawkins and play their home games at the Addition Financial Arena on the university's main campus in Orlando, Florida.

Previous season
The Knights finished the 2018–19 season 24–9 overall and 13–5 in AAC play to finish in a tie for third place. In the AAC tournament, they lost to Memphis in the quarterfinals. They received an at-large bid to the NCAA tournament for the first time since 2005. They defeated VCU in the first round before losing Duke in the second round.

Offseason

Departures

Incoming transfers

2019 recruiting class

2020 recruiting class

Roster 

Jan. 13, 2020 - Yuat Alok elected to transfer to Southern Utah after the fall semester. Alok did not play in a single game for the Knights.

Schedule and results
Source

|-
!colspan=9 style=| Non-conference regular season

|-
!colspan=6 style=|AAC regular season

|-
!colspan=9 style=|American Athletic Conference tournament

1.Cancelled due to the Coronavirus Pandemic

Awards and honors

American Athletic Conference honors

Rookie of the Week
Week 14: Darin Green Jr.

Source

References

UCF Knights men's basketball seasons
UCF
UCF Knights men's basketball
UCF Knights men's basketball